Shevdivadar is a village in the Bhavnagar district of Gujarat in western India.

History 
Shevdivadar was a petty princely state, in the Gohelwar prant of Kathiawar, comprising only the single village.

It had a population of 177 in 1901, yielding a state revenue of 1,100 Rupees (1903-4, nearly all from land) and a paying a tribute of 60 Rupees, to the Gaekwar Baroda State and Junagadh State.

Sources and external links 
 Imperial Gazetteer, on dsal.uchicago.edu

References

Villages in Bhavnagar district
Princely states of Gujarat